Muhammad ibn Azhar ad-Din (reigned 1488–1518) was a Sultan of the Sultanate of Adal. Sihab ad-Din Ahmad states in his Futuh al-Habasa that he was the son of Azhar, the second son of Abu Bakr, one of the ten sons of Sa'ad ad-Din II, and ruled for 30 years.

Reign
Sultan Muhammad attempted to remain at peace with the Emperor of Ethiopia Na'od, but his efforts were foiled by the frequent raids of Imam Mahfuz. He was present with Imam Mahfuz when Emperor Lebna Dengel attacked and destroyed the Imam's army in Dawaro in 1516.

Muhammad was murdered upon his return from an expedition against Ethiopia a few years after the Imam's death. J. Spencer Trimingham states that he was succeeded as Sultan of Adal by Garad Abun ibn Adash, who was not a member of the Walashma dynasty; Sihab ad-Din, however, writes that it was his relative in marriage, Muhammad bin Abu Bakr bin Mahfuz, who succeeded him as Sultan. Richard Pankhurst follows Trimingham's general account, noting that Adal "was then torn apart by intestinal struggles, five sultans succeeding one another within two years."

See also
Walashma dynasty

Notes

1518 deaths
15th-century monarchs in Africa
16th-century monarchs in Africa
Sultans of the Adal Sultanate
Year of birth unknown
15th-century Somalian people
16th-century Somalian people